KF Murlani, is a football club based in Vau i Dejës, Albania. The club plays in the Kategoria e Dytë, which is the third tier of football in the country.

History
In 2019, the club was formed as a youth team to promote sport in the town of Vau i Dejës. In 2021, they included a full senior team, competing for the first time as a team in fourth tier of Albanian football Kategoria e Tretë. In their first season, they achieved second place, gaining promotion to Kategoria e Dytë.

Players

Current squad

Honours

League titles
 Kategoria e Tretë
 Runner Ups (1): 2021

References

Association football clubs established in 2019
KF Murlani
2019 establishments in Albania
Vau i Dejës
Albanian Third Division clubs
Kategoria e Dytë clubs